The 1912 Iowa gubernatorial election was held on November 5, 1912. Republican nominee George W. Clarke defeated Democratic nominee Edward G. Dunn with 39.93% of the vote.

Primary elections
Primary elections were held on June 3, 1912.

Democratic primary

Candidates
Edward G. Dunn
John Taylor Hamilton, former U.S. Representative

Results

Republican primary

Candidates
George W. Clarke, incumbent Lieutenant Governor
Perry Greeley Holden, Iowa State University professor
A. V. Proudfoot

Results

General election

Candidates
Major party candidates
George W. Clarke, Republican
Edward G. Dunn, Democratic 

Other candidates
John L. Stevens, Progressive
I. S. McCrillis, Socialist
C. Durant Jones, Prohibition

Results

References

1912
Iowa
Gubernatorial